The 2021 Missouri Valley Conference baseball tournament was held from May 25 through 30, 2021.  All eight baseball-sponsoring schools in the conference participated in the double-elimination tournament held at Southern Illinois University's Itchy Jones Stadium in Carbondale, Illinois.  The winner of the tournament, Dallas Baptist, earned the conference's automatic bid to the 2021 NCAA Division I baseball tournament.

Seeding and format
The league's eight teams were seeded based on conference winning percentage.  The four lowest seeded teams played in a single elimination round, with the two winners advancing to the six-team double-elimination bracket.

Results

Play-In Round

Double-Elimination Rounds

Conference championship

References

Tournament
Missouri Valley Conference Baseball Tournament
Missouri Valley Conference baseball tournament
Missouri Valley Conference baseball tournament